The Virginia Park Historic District is located on the north side of New Center, an area in Detroit, Michigan, along both sides of Virginia Park Street from Woodward Avenue to the John C. Lodge Freeway access road.  The district was listed on the National Register of Historic Places in 1982.

The Virginia Park Historic District is an example of a well–preserved late nineteenth to early twentieth century residential community. The residences are testimonials to the wealth of early Virginia Park residents, as the area was conceived as an upper-middle class enclave. Many homes were completed by prominent Detroit architects, and display a diversity of architectural styles.

History  
The district was laid out in 1893 by developed by John W. Leggett, Frank E. Snow, and Joseph C. Hough. Ninety-two lots were platted and each given a name (such as Tanglewood, Thisteldown, and Sorrento) in the original plat. The developers placed a number of restrictions on the area to ensure an attractive community. This quiet boulevard attracted a mix of businessmen and professionals. The first houses were constructed in 1895, and by 1908 more than two dozen houses had been constructed in the district.

By 1910, homeowners became concerned about the effect of the increasing commercialization of Woodward Avenue on property values, and they formed the Virginia Avenue Improvement Association.  The association proposed to re-landscape the subdivision, and it developed an attractive entrance to the community. The neighborhood continued to thrive during the 1920s, but in the 1930s it suffered from the Great Depression, the effects of which continued through the 1940s. By the 1950s and 1960s, many of the houses had absentee landlords, or were divided into rooming houses. The Algiers Motel, at one time located at the corner of Virginia Park and Woodward, was the scene of an incident of police brutality during the 1967 Detroit riot where three men were killed and others were beaten.

In 1979, General Motors announced its plan to renovate the area north of its World Headquarters. This fostered rehabilitation in the Virginia Park district. The Algiers Motel was demolished in 1979, and replaced with a park space. The Virginia Park Historic District is considered to mark the northern boundary of the New Center area of Detroit.

In 2022, one of Detroit’s last remaining brick roads, built in 1907 in Virginia Park, has begun a $2 million rehabilitation. Stretching three blocks along Virginia Park Street between Woodward Ave, and the Lodge Freeway. As many as 20,000 age appropriate Nelsonville block pavers have been assembled for the repair work.

Description
The Virginia Park District was platted as a series of lots 50 feet wide and 163 feet deep. The original restrictions in the neighborhood ensured a uniformity in the streetscape. All buildings are constructed of brick or stone, and have the same setback from the street. All are single family houses, with no more than one house on each fifty foot lot.

At the time of its historic designation, the district included 57 structures, all but three of which contribute to the historic character of neighborhood. Non-contributing structures included an apartment building at 650 Virginia Park, an office building at 613 Virginia Park, and a hospital (demolished in 2014) at 801-831 Virginia Park. Fifty-one of the contributing structures were used as homes, two as offices and one as a rest home. The residences were constructed between 1895 and 1915, with the older structures placed closer to Woodward, and newer ones, in general, farther westward.

Education
The area is zoned to Detroit Public Schools.

All residents are zoned to Thirkell Elementary School, Hutchins Middle School, and Northwestern High School.

Images

See also

 Midtown
 New Center
 Corktown
 North Corktown
 National Register of Historic Places listings in Detroit, Michigan

Notes

References and further reading

External links 
 

1895 establishments in Michigan
Historic districts in Detroit
Historic districts on the National Register of Historic Places in Michigan
National Register of Historic Places in Detroit